Bayan County is a county of Heilongjiang Province, Northeast China, it is under the administration of the prefecture-level city of Harbin, the capital of Heilongjiang. It borders Mulan County to the east, Bin County to the south, Hulan District to the west, as well as the prefecture-level city of Suihua to the north.

Administrative divisions
There are ten towns and eight townships in the county:

Towns (镇）
 Bayan
Xinglong
Xiji
Waxing
Longquan
Bayangang
Longmiao
Wanfa
Tianzeng
Heishan

Townships (乡)
Songhuajiang Township
Fujiang Township
Huashan Township
Fengle Township
Dexiang Township
Hongguang Township
Shanhou Township
Zhendong Township

Demographics 

Climate

References 

Bayan